Zachary Atticus Tinker (born May 8, 1994) is an American actor. He is best known for his role as Fenmore Baldwin in the CBS Daytime soap opera The Young and the Restless. In 2019, Tinker was nominated for a Daytime Emmy Award for his portrayal as the character. Tinker has also appeared in Law & Order True Crime, American Horror Story, NCIS: Los Angeles and Why Women Kill. In 2021, Tinker was  cast as Sonny Kiriakis in the television miniseries Days of Our Lives: Beyond Salem, a spinoff of the long-running NBC soap Days of Our Lives. In 2022, Tinker stepped into the role on the main series.

Early life and education
Though Tinker was born in New York, he relocated to Los Angeles when he was 3 years old. He is the son of television producer and writer John Tinker and Lori Mozilo. Lori is an executive at Disney and is of Italian ancestry. Tinker's parents are divorced. Through his father, Tinker is the grandson of television executive Grant Tinker and the nephew of producer and director Mark Tinker. Tinker began acting as a child in elementary school.

He also had aspirations of going to the NBA until he stopped growing when he was a teenager. He started his college career at Gonzaga University. Like his father, and brother, Tinker planned to become a writer. However, after he participated in a theater production of Stephen Belber's Tape, Tinker realized he wanted to a career as an actor. Up until that point, acting was just a hobby. He then transferred to Loyola Marymount University in his Junior year as a theater major. In 2019, Tinker jokingly described himself as the "black sheep" of his family for becoming an actor. However, despite his father's initial reservations, Tinker said his family has been supportive.

Career
Tinker booked his first major television role in 2015 when he appeared in an episode of TNT's Murder in the First. In 2016, he appeared in an episode of My Crazy Ex and the film Dear Diary, I Died. In 2017, Tinker appeared in Law & Order True Crime, a dramatic retelling of the murder trial of Lyle and Erik Menendez. In 2018, Tinker would go on to appear in episodes of CBS's NCIS and the Facebook Watch series, Turnt. In November 2018, it was announced that he had joined the cast of The Young and the Restless as a recast of Fenmore as the previous actor, Max Ehrich, was unable to reprise the role. The character was written out in early 2019. That year, Tinker would also in an episode of You're the Worst. In the summer of 2019, Tinker was cast as Sam in American Horror Story: 1984, the ninth season of the horror anthology series. In November 2019, it was announced that he would reprise the role Fen in December 2019.

Tinker's Fenmore was written out again in early 2020. Throughout 2020, Tinker would appear in episodes of ABC's Station 19, Netflix's 13 Reasons Why, and L.A.'s Finest. In August 2021, Tinker joined the cast of the Days of Our Lives spinoff miniseries Beyond Salem as a recast of Sonny Kiriakis, a role originated by Freddie Smith. The series would stream on Peacock exclusively. Tinker would reprise the role in the holiday movie Days of Our Lives: A Very Salem Christmas. On February 11, 2022, Days of Our Lives announced that Tinker was slated to step into the role of Sonny on the main show. Tinker made his debut on Days of Our Lives on March 10, 2022 as a series regular. Tinker last appeared as a series regular on December 27, 2022. In January 2023, Tinker briefly reprised the role of Fenmore Baldwin on The Young and the Restless. On January 27, 2023, it was announced that Tinker had joined the cast of Fire Country.

Personal life
In 2019, Tinker was romantically linked with his The Young and the Restless co-star Cait Fairbanks. The duo officially confirmed that they were dating in early 2020.

Filmography

Awards and nominations

References

External links

Living people
1994 births
American male television actors
American male film actors
American people of Italian descent
People from New York City
Male actors from Los Angeles